Bloody Island may refer to:

 Bloody Island (Mississippi River), a former sandbar island in the Mississippi River oppose St. Louis, Missouri, now part of Illinois
 Bloody Island, a former island in Clear Lake in California
 Bloody Island Massacre, an 1850 massacre, for which the California island is named, of Pomo Indians by the U.S. Army
 Gunther Island in Humboldt County, California, site of an 1860 massacre of Indians
 The Vampires of Bloody Island, a British feature film released in 2010